Centennial Hills Hospital Medical Center is a for-profit hospital owned by Universal Health Services and operated by Valley Health System located in the Centennial Hills neighborhood in Las Vegas, Nevada, United States at 6900 North Durango Drive near U.S. Route 95 and Clark County 215.

History
The hospital opened its eight-story tower on January 21, 2008, having originally planned to open in Autumn 2007. The building included  of space for future expansion.
It is the first tobacco-free campus in Nevada.
Centennial Hills Hospital Medical Center was the first medical facility in the state to offer the scanning system known as the O-arm.

In 2015 the daughter of Amy Vilela was turned away from Centennial Hills Hospital because of a lack of health insurance after having presented symptoms of a deep vein thrombosis. She later died when the blood clot broke off and became a pulmonary embolism

Services
 Emergency Department and Fast Track staffed with Emergency Medicine-trained physicians and Registered Nurses certified in ACLS and PALS.
 Accredited Chest Pain Center with PCI
 Accredited Primary Stroke Center
 Accredited Heart Failure Center 
 Therapeutic hypothermia Certified Medical Center
 Women's Center with Level II NICU
 ICU
 Computed Tomography
 MRI
 Nuclear Medicine
 Respiratory Therapy
 Minimally Invasive Surgical Center
 Endoscopy
 Cardiology
 Radiology
 Orthopedic surgery

Heliport
A helipad is available for emergency air ambulance service.

Awards and accolades
 Certified by The Joint Commission for Primary Stroke Centers as an Advanced Primary Stroke Center
 Accredited Chest Pain Center
 Accreditation from the American Heart Association and American Stroke Association for success in using "Get with the Guidelines" program to improve quality of care for heart disease and stroke patients
 2014 Leader in LGBT Healthcare Equality by the Human Rights Campaign (HRC) Foundation.

References

External links
 

2008 establishments in Nevada
Hospital buildings completed in 2008
Hospitals established in 2008
Hospitals in Las Vegas
Hospitals in the Las Vegas Valley